Lopevi (or Lopévi) is an uninhabited island in Malampa Province, Vanuatu. It lies to the southeast of Ambrym and east of Paama.

Geography
Lopevi consists of the 7-km-wide cone of the active stratovolcano by the same name. It reaches a peak of 1413 m above sea level, the tallest point in central Vanuatu. It has erupted at least 22 times since 1862. The island was formerly inhabited, but in 1960 the population moved to nearby Paama or Epi because of the recurrent danger.

Lopevi is on the New Hebrides Plate, where it lies above the subducted Australian Plate to the west. Because there are no earthquakes between 50 and 200 km below the Earth's surface, it is thought that the subducted plate has fractured, and does not appear between these depths.

References

External links

 John Seach site, with photographs
 Settlement history of Lopevi

Uninhabited islands of Vanuatu
Malampa Province
Volcanoes of Vanuatu
Holocene stratovolcanoes
Active volcanoes